Kim Yo-han may refers to:
 Kim Yo-han (volleyball)
 Kim Yo-han (singer)